Daniel J. Ugaste is a lawyer, politician and Republican member of the Illinois House of Representatives for the 65th district.  The district, located in the Chicago metropolitan area, includes all or parts of Batavia, Elgin, Geneva, Hampshire, South Elgin, and St. Charles.

Education and Law Career 
The first person in his family to complete college, Ugaste earned a Bachelor of Arts at Lake Forest College and a juris doctor at DePaul University College of Law.

In the 1990's, Ugaste was an attorney for Seyfarth Shaw, Limited Liability Partnership and Wiedner & McAuliffe, Limited Company.

Ugaste is a shareholder in the Nyhan, Bambrick, Kinzie and Lowry Law Firm and specializes in workers compensation. He worked as a member of the Illinois Workers Compensation Medical Fee Advisory Board and as a technical advisor to Bruce Rauner's Office on Workers Compensation Reform.

Illinois House of Representatives 
In 2018, Ugaste was elected to the Illinois House of Representatives, defeating Democratic candidate Richard Johnson - the President of the Elgin Teachers Union. He succeed retiring incumbent Steven Andersson.

In 2020, he was re-elected, narrowly defeating activist Martha Paschke.

Ugaste won a third term in 2022, against scientist and small business owner Linda Robertson. Ugaste's former campaign committee chairman endorsed Robertson over Ugaste in the race, saying that Robertson had "made it clear that she will protect our rights to make personal decisions and live without excessive government interference," and that Robertson was the "better candidate."

Committees 
In the 102nd Illinois General Assembly, Ugaste served on the House Committees on Energy & Environment; Judiciary; Labor & Commerce; Police & Fire; and the subcommittees on Civil Procedure & Tort Liability; Roadways, Rail, & Aviation; and Workforce Development.

Positions & Votes 
Ugaste has consistently voted against protections for workers and LGBTQ people, abortion access, and criminal justice and gun control reforms.

 Voted against prohibiting housing discrimination based on one's source of income
 Did not vote on a bill prohibiting the sale of and possession of homemade firearms
 Voted against a resolution supporting reproductive rights
 Voted against safeguards for older LGBTQ+ people
 Voted against requiring employers to provide each employee at least 24 consecutive hours of rest for every 7 day period
 Voted against prohibiting schools from denying a student their transcript because of unpaid debt
 Voted against expanding protections for victims of domestic violence in the workplace
 Did not vote on a bill allowing school district employees fully vaccinated against COVID-19 to take paid sick days without repercussion if they or their child have COVID-19
 Voted establishing an agriculture equity commission
 Voted against the SAFE-T Act
 Voted against repealing the Parental Notice of Abortion Act, which required the legal guardian of a minor receiving an abortion to be notified of the abortion
 Voted against prohibiting cities and counties from entering into contracts with ICE
 Voted against consumer protections on online retail
 Voted against prohibiting school discrimination against certain hairstyles
 Voted against a red flag law
 Voted against requiring public and private schools comply with Illinois Department of Public Health COVID-19 regulations
 Voted against amending the Equitable Restrooms Act to allow for all-gender restrooms
 Co-sponsored a bill placing term limits on general assembly leadership positions
 Voted against establishing the right to counsel for undocumented immigrants
 Voted against expanding ballot drop boxes and curbside voting
 Voted against reducing racial disparities in medical care
 Voted against authorizing victims in personal injury and wrongful death cases to collect interest on money they receive from court
 Voted against emphasizing the contributions Black and other minority groups in school curriculum 
 Voted against the 2020-2021 state budget
 Voted in favor of establishing worker protections regarding the COVID-19 pandemic
 Voted against expanding absentee voting in the 2020 election
 Voted in favor of capping the cost of insulin to $100 per thirty days
 Voted against allowing student athletes to receive compensation for their name, image or likeness
 Voted against authorizing student absences for voting
 Voted against establishing that public employees have the right to unionize
 Voted against legalizing recreational cannabis
 Voted against establishing a graduated state income tax
 Voted against the 2019-2020 state budget
 Voted against establishing rehabilitation classes as a means to reduce prison sentences
 Voted against appropriating $45 billion for infrastructure repairs
 Voted against expanding voting access in jails
 Voted against expanding abortion protections
 Voted against prohibiting animal testing on products sold in Illinois
 Voted in favor of prohibiting puppy mills
 Voted against expanding legal protections for undocumented immigrants
 Voted against prohibiting electronic monitoring for people who have completed state sentences
 Voted in favor of requiring police departments to keep records on racial profiling
 Co-sponsored a bill increasing fines for motorists who pass school busses
 Voted against prohibiting private prisons and detention centers
 Voted against allowing for a non-binary gender marker on state ID's
 Voted against increasing penalties for employers who commit wage theft
 Voted against increasing teachers baseline salary
 Voted against allowing food stamp benefits to be used in restaurants
 Voted against requiring civics education
 Voted against prohibiting smoking in a vehicle with a minor present 
 Voted against requiring public schools to teach about prominent LGBTQ+ figures
 Voted against raising the minimum wage to $15

Personal life 
Ugaste lives in Geneva and is married. He has three adult daughters.

Electoral history

References

External links
 Campaign Website

Year of birth missing (living people)
21st-century American politicians
DePaul University College of Law alumni
Illinois lawyers
Lake Forest College alumni
Republican Party members of the Illinois House of Representatives
People from Geneva, Illinois
Living people